Kutinska Slatina is a village in Croatia.

References

Kutina
Populated places in Sisak-Moslavina County